The Three Bogatyrs (Три богатыря) is an animated franchise produced by Melnitsa Animation Studio. Voices of Sergey Makovetsky, Dmitry Vysotsky, Liya Medvedeva, Valery Soloviev, Oleg Kulikovich, Oleg Tabakov, Anatoly Petrov, Andrei Tolubeyev and Fyodor Bondarchuk with Elizaveta Boyarskaya are featured in the films. The overall plot through the series follows the adventures of three most famous bogatyrs: Alyosha Popovich, Dobrynya Nikitich and Ilya Muromets.

The series has now grossed over $135 million, making it the most high-grossing Russian animated films and earning a spot as one of the most profitable Russian films in the last 10 years.

This animated film is anachronistic, following the lead of the other films in this series. Set in medieval times, this film combines the history of early Russia, Belarus and Ukraine and Slavic and Russian folklore with more modern elements including a nod to Alexander Pushkin and video games. Each of the first three films featured one of the bogatyrs, Russian epic heroes, based very loosely on the heroes in the legends about Prince Vladimir in the Kievan-Rus’ bylina cycle, a collection of traditional Russian oral epic narrative poems. The fourth film, The Three Bogatyrs and the Shamakhan Queen, unites all three of the bogatyrs, Alyosha Popovich, Ilya Muromets and Dobrynya Nikitych, in one film and includes unforgettable sidekicks such as Julius the talking horse, introduced in the previous films. Unlike the other three animated features, this film also makes reference to the Russian literature from 19th century and the famous narrative epic of Alexander Pushkin: The Tale of the Golden Cockerel (Сказка о золотом петушке, 1834) with the addition of the Shamakhan Queen.

The commercial success of this series has been increasing since the release of the first film in 2004, in part, because of such marketing.

Highest Grossers

Feature films

Alyosha Popovich and Tugarin Zmey (2004)
"Alyosha Popovich and Tugarin Zmey (2004)" the screen version of the Russian bylina about Alesha Popovic and his enemy Tugarin the Serpent.

Dobrynya Nikitich and Zmey Gorynych (2006)

Ilya Muromets and Nightingale the Robber (2007)

How Not to Rescue a Princess (2010)
The Three Bogatyrs and the Shamakhan Queen or How Not to Rescue a Princess is the fourth film in the animated series and was released December 30, 2010.

The DVD was released on 17 February 2011 and during the first six weeks made 566,731,786 rubles, breaking the record for Russian animated films and earning a spot as one of the most profitable Russian films in the last 10 years.

Three Heroes on Distant Shores (2012)
In English-speaking countries it was distributed as "Three Bogatyrs Far Far away", which was commercially successful despite rather negative reviews.

Kolyvan and Baba Yaga plan to take over the palace of the Prince of Kiev. They succeed in their attempt with the help of a singular army—two enormous bunnies. They also create a fake source of legitimation, the doubles of the three bogatyrs, who affirm that the charlatans are the legitimate successors of the Prince. In the meantime, with the help of further magic, Baba Yaga banishes the real bogatyrs to a remote shore. The plot develops through various episodes involving the impostors with their bunnies, the Prince of Kiev with the horse Iulii, the bogatyrs’ wives with the doubles, the real bogatyrs with the indigenous people and a giant gorilla, and the appearance of some characters from the previous series—Tikhon, babka and the dragon Gorynych.

The film is perhaps most successful in presenting a straight criticism on Russian society and rulers. A satire that is undoubtedly addressed at contemporary Russia, but that has in itself recurrent traits of satirical works emerging at different times during the Russian and Soviet era: infatuation with foreign products, blind awe towards foreigners, ineptitude of the rulers to govern, corruption, unfair tax collection, high prices on produce, and swift acceptance of new impostors without any opposition. This type of satirical accent acquires even more weight when followed by shots of nationalist characters, such as the beautiful domes of the village that assume different colors from the reflection of the rising sun.

To the contrary of many contemporary foreign animated films, Three Bogatyrs relies more on traditional, drawn animation than on computer graphics. As in many animation movies made in Russia, characters and scenes are first drawn, scanned, and only then do computer animators fill in the tasks of coloring, adding  backgrounds and special effects. Computers help the construction of the film and offer some special features, but the process of drawing successfully preserves the film from the cold and artificial effect that is common to pure computer animation.

Three Heroes. Horse Course (2015)
Known also as "Roundabout way and new adventures of ancient Bogatyrs".

Court horse named Julius Caesar is at the hub of activity. The horse is supposed to save the grand duke of Kiev while the Bogatyrs are absent trying to catch the robber. The evil goes further eventually planning to take over not ancient Russia but over the whole world.
The villain is represented by a living oak tree who gambles and outplays simpletons. The second bad guy is a robber named Potanya.

The Three Heroes and the Sea King (2016)

Three Heroes and the Princess of Egypt (2017)

Three Heroes and the Heir to the Throne (2018)

Characters
 Vladimir, Prince of Kiev - The ruler of Kievan Rus.
 Ilya Muromets - the oldest and most powerful bogatyr; married to Alenushka, a journalist.
 Dobrynya Nikitich - bogatyr who loves to sleep, and believes that dreams bring powers; head of the Prince's Guard; married to Nastasya Philippovna.
 Alyosha Popovich - the youngest bogatyr; born in Rostov; married to Lyubova; friends with Julius Caesar the Talking Horse and Tikhon.
 Kolyvan - fat merchant who had the magical power to win in the lottery. He became a friend to the Prince of Kiev and Baba-Yaga.
 Zmey Gorinich - three-headed dragon; friend of Dobrynya Nikitich. Although in the Bylinas, Dobrynya fought the beast, in the films Dobrynya trusts him.
 Tugarin Zmey - evil and greedy; commander of the tugar army.
 Baba Yaga - happy old woman who brews potions and, unlike in some fairy tales, does not eat anyone. Deals with forest and wetland ecology. Friends with Kolyvan and released his debts.
 Basileus - Byzantine Emperor, the "sworn brother" to Prince of Kiev. Bad, greedy and cowardly: all the qualities of the prince of Kiev, doubled.
 Nightingale the Robber - evil, treacherous and cunning thief. Stole gold coins from the Prince of Kiev as well as the horse of Ilya Muromets.
 Burushka - the horse of Ilya Muromets.
 Julius Caesar, The Talking Horse - The horse of Alyosha Popovich; born in Novgorod, where he read a lot of books, because he lived in the Church library. He Named himself after the Roman emperor.
 Vasya - The camel of Dobrynya Nikitich
 Oak - the antagonist of the sixth movie
 Potanya - the sea pirate

See also
 Russian animation

External links
 
 Official Channel in YouTube
 Official Facebook homepage

Film series introduced in 2004
Animated film series
Animated comedy films
Russian children's fantasy films
2000s fantasy comedy films
2000s adventure comedy films
2010s fantasy comedy films
2010s adventure comedy films
Cultural depictions of Vladimir the Great
2010s Russian-language films
Films about animals
Films set in Russia
Films set in the Middle Ages
Russian animated fantasy films
2010s children's comedy films
Kievan Rus in fiction
Mass media franchises
Melnitsa Animation Studio animated films